William Jones Boone (17 May 1846 – 5 October 1891) was the fourth Anglican missionary bishop of Shanghai. Boone was born in Shanghai, son of and namesake of William Jones Boone. He studied at Princeton University and attended Virginia Theological Seminary prior to his ordination to the diaconate in Petersburg, Virginia in 1868. He was consecrated Bishop of Shanghai on 28 October 1884.

Consecrators
 Channing Moore Williams
 Charles Perry Scott
 George Evans Moule

Boone was the 135th bishop consecrated for the Episcopal Church.

Bibliography
 Correspondence in Connection with the Protest against the Consecration of Rev. W. J. Boone as Missionary Bishop of the Protestant Episcopal Church in China. Also Letters Referring to the Wretched Management of the Mission (1885)

See also

 Protestant missions in China 1807-1953

1845 births
1891 deaths
Virginia Theological Seminary alumni
Episcopal bishops of Shanghai
19th-century Anglican bishops in China
19th-century American clergy
American expatriates in Shanghai